Fred, Frederic or Frederick Sullivan may refer to:

 Fred Sullivan (1837–1877), English actor and singer, brother of composer Arthur Sullivan
 Frederic Richard Sullivan (1872–1937), American film director and actor, nephew of Arthur Sullivan
 Frederick R. Sullivan (1905–1968), American sheriff and politician
 Frederick Sullivan (cricketer) (1797–1873), English cricketer
 Fred Sullivan (American football), American football coach